The PAC-PAD 1 is the first version of an Android tablet computer developed by the Pakistan Aeronautical Complex Kamra in collaboration with Hong Kong based INNAVTEK International. A succeeding model is being developed with cell phone network data connectivity.

INNAVTEK also provides electronics for the jet fighters that Pakistan Aeronautical Complex assembles. Shortly after the release of the PAC-PAD 1, its sister tablet PAC-PAD Takhti 7 was announced. The Takhti 7 has double the RAM and CPU speed of the PAD 1 and uses the latest Android IceCream Sandwich operating system.

Features

Processor: 1 GHz ARM11
Operating System: Android OS 2.3
Memory: 256 MB RAM
Storage: Card Extendible 4GB, 32GB, SD/TF support
Flash: 2/4/8/16GB
Dimensions: Height: 192 mm, Width: 128 mm, Depth: 13 mm
Weight: 385 grams
Display: 7", 16:9 Touch screen Capacitive TFT display
Camera: 0.3 MP
Connectivity: Wi-Fi: 802.11 b/g
USB: USB 2.0
HDMI: HDMI standard port mini port, support for HDMI 1.3, supports full screen output to HDMI devices
Content Formats Supported 	MP3, WMA, AAC, 3GP, WAV, JPG, BMP, PNG, GIF, AVI, MKV, WMV, MOV, MP4, MPEG, MPG, FLV
Miscellaneous 	G-sensor, Internal 3d acceleration, 3.5mm Earphone Jack
Browsers: Opera, UCWeb, Skyfire, Dolphin
Software & Games: Word, Excel, Powerpoint, 3D games can be supported by internal 3D acceleration
Supported Audio Formats: MP3, WMA, AAC, WAV
Supported video Formats: AVI, MKV, WMV, MOV, MP4, MPEG, MPG, FLV
Supported Image Formats: JPG, BMP, PNG, GIF highest support 4096 x4096
Other Supported Formats: PDF, TXT
Supported Languages: English, French, German, Italian, Japanese, Korean, Polish, Russian, Spanish, Chinese Simple, Chinese traditional.
Sensor: G_Sensor
Supports online games, online video streaming, online TV, online radio

See also
Android (operating system)

References

External links
Official website
PAC-PAD 1 Tablet by Pakistan Aeronautical Complex and INNAVTEK
From Kamra To Karachi
Pakistan's first homegrown android tablet
News Report regarding release of PAC PAD-1

Pakistan Aeronautical Complex products
Tablet computers introduced in 2012
Android (operating system) devices
Information technology in Pakistan
Tablet computers